God Save the Animals is the ninth studio album by American musician Alex G, released on September 23, 2022, through Domino Recording Company.

Recording 
God Save the Animals was recorded at Headroom Studios, Spice House, and Alex's home in Philadelphia, as well as SugarHouse in New York City, Clubhouse in Rhinebeck, New York, Gradwell House Recording in Haddon Heights, New Jersey, and Watersong Music in Bowdoinham, Maine. The album was co-produced by Alex G and Jacob Portrait.

Promotion 
God Save the Animals was announced on June 21, 2022, alongside the release of the album's second single "Runner". The album's first single, "Blessing" released on May 23, 2022, prior to the album's announcement. A third single, "Cross the Sea", was released on July 26, 2022. A fourth single, "Miracles", was released on September 8, 2022.

On July 19, 2022, Alex G performed the single "Runner" on The Tonight Show Starring Jimmy Fallon and also performed the single "Miracles" on The Late Show with Stephen Colbert.

Critical reception 

God Save the Animals has received widespread acclaim from music critics. At Metacritic, which assigns a normalized rating out of 100 to reviews from professional publications, the album received an average score of 86, based on 16 reviews. Aggregator AnyDecentMusic? gave it 8.2 out of 10, based on their assessment of the critical consensus.

Will Richards of NME gave the album a perfect five-star rating, praising its "newfound clarity and vulnerability" and writing that it "further confirms his place as one of his generation's most consistently brilliant songwriters." Writing for Beats Per Minute, John Amen gave the album a score of 85%, commenting that "God Save the Animals’ production approaches are understated compared to those employed in previous work yet still precisely rendered. What stand out – prominently and unabashedly – are Alex’s impeccably crafted and irresistibly delivered songs." Aaron Mook of Chorus.fm "Highly Recommended" the album, writing that it "does exactly what most new albums should: it takes the best aspects of Alex G’s past work...and miraculously weaves them into something new. The album is rich with details that become more rewarding with every listen, making God Save the Animals not only an album of the year contender, but among the best work of the songwriter’s career."

In a mixed review, Chris Catchpole of Mojo wrote, "The inventiveness on display is undeniably impressive, but the process sometimes hides a little too much of the artist behind it."

Year-end lists

Track listing

Personnel 

 Alexander Giannascoli – songwriting, production, engineering
 Samuel Acchione – guitar (tracks 3, 8, 9, 13), banjo (track 13)
 Jessica Lea Mayfield – additional vocals (track 1)
 John Heywood – bass (tracks 8, 9, 13)
 Tom Kelly – drums (tracks 5, 8, 13)
 Molly Germer – strings (tracks 9, 12), string arrangement (tracks 9, 12), additional vocals (track 3)
 Jacob Portrait – production, mixing, engineering
 Mark Watter – engineering
 Kyle Pulley – engineering
 Scoops Dardaris – engineering
 Eric Bogacz – engineering
 Connor Priest – engineering
 Steve Poponi – engineering
 Earl Bigelow – engineering
 Anjan Alavandar – assistant engineering
 Isaac Eiger – assistant engineering
 Shubham Mondal – assistant engineering
 Sophie Shalit – assistant engineering
 Heba Kadry – mastering
 Rachel Giannascoli Masciantonio – artwork

Charts

References 

2022 albums
Alex G albums
Domino Recording Company albums